Vatra is a town in Chișinău municipality, Moldova, with a population of 3500 people.

References

Cities and towns in Chișinău Municipality
Cities and towns in Moldova